All Rise for Julian Clary is a British light entertainment game show broadcast on BBC2 from 27 September 1996 to 22 December 1997.  The show centers around Julian being a judge in a mock court room, with contestants arguing their case before Judge Julian Clary.  In all cases, the loser has to do a forfeit.

Transmissions

Series

Special

References

External links

1990s British comedy television series
1996 British television series debuts
1997 British television series endings
BBC television comedy
1990s British legal television series
1990s British reality television series
English-language television shows